Superheroes is a 2021 Italian romantic comedy-drama film directed by Paolo Genovese, starring Alessandro Borghi and Jasmine Trinca.

Cast

References

External links

2021 films
Films directed by Paolo Genovese
Italian romantic comedy-drama films
2020s Italian-language films
2020s Italian films